is a Japanese racing driver turned politician.

Before Formula One
Yamamoto was born in Toyohashi, Aichi Prefecture. He began his racing career in 1994 at the Suzuka Circuit Racing School (Karting), and worked his way up through the ranks, to become the test/third driver for the Jordan Formula One team for one weekend (Japan) during the 2005 Formula One season.

Formula One

Super Aguri (2006)
On 8 June 2006, Sakon Yamamoto joined the Super Aguri F1 team as their test driver and third driver on grand prix weekends, helping Takuma Sato and Franck Montagny in Friday's free practice sessions. Yamamoto replaced Montagny in the second team car at the German Grand Prix in Hockenheim. He did not enjoy a particularly successful start to his career, however, with a mechanical failure and a stalled engine restricting him to a total of one lap in his first two races. He also damaged one of the team's new SA06 chassis in a crash during Free Practice at the German Grand Prix. He then spun out of his third Grand Prix in Turkey, a disappointment after outqualifying Sato for the first time.

At the 2006 Italian Grand Prix, Yamamoto had a major effect on the championship after suffering a tyre delamination during qualifying, which consigned him to last place on the grid. Later on in the session, Fernando Alonso punctured a tyre on debris from this incident, an occurrence which would eventually result in the points leader being penalised for blocking Felipe Massa and dropping from fifth to tenth on the grid. During the race, Yamamoto suffered hydraulic problems and had to start from the pit lane, eventually retiring when it became terminal.

At the 2006 Chinese Grand Prix, however, he finished for the first time, albeit four laps down in sixteenth place. After the race, his enjoyment was spoiled when Nick Heidfeld admonished him for an incident on the last lap which had dropped the German from 4th to 7th place. However, Heidfeld had mistaken Yamamoto for Sato, the driver who caused the incident, and apologised for his mistake before the 2006 Japanese Grand Prix.

Yamamoto finished the season strongly with three consecutive finishes, an upturn in form after retiring from his first four Grands Prix. He also set the seventh fastest lap and second fastest middle sector during the 2006 Brazilian Grand Prix. However, this was not enough to prevent him losing out to Anthony Davidson in the race for the second Super Aguri race drive in 2007. However, he remained as a test driver at Super Aguri. This was combined with him competing in the 2007 GP2 Series season with BCN Competicion.

Spyker (2007)

With the departure of Christijan Albers from the Spyker F1 team after the 2007 British Grand Prix, a position on the grid became available. On 26 July 2007, after Markus Winkelhock filled the seat at the eventful 2007 European Grand Prix, Spyker confirmed that they hired Yamamoto from Super Aguri for the remainder of the 2007 Formula One season by Spyker. During his first Grand Prix for Spyker at Hungary, he crashed out on lap 4. After that, he finished all the races in last position, except the 2007 Japanese Grand Prix, where he finished ahead of Jarno Trulli, and in the 2007 Brazilian Grand Prix where Giancarlo Fisichella crashed into him on the first laps. After the season ended, Yamamoto did not participate in any other event for the team.

Renault (2008)
It was announced on 4 February 2008 that Yamamoto would be one of the test drivers for the Renault F1 Team.  According to the press release, he would only drive the car in public demonstrations and not in circuit tests, with Lucas di Grassi and Romain Grosjean being announced as circuit test drivers at the launch of the Renault R28. Sanho Human Service sponsored Spyker F1 when Yamamoto was a driver, and it was announced at the R28 launch that Sanho Human Service would sponsor Renault in 2008.

Return to GP2 (2008–2009)

Yamamoto made his return to the GP2 series halfway through the 2008 season, as the ART Grand Prix team elected to employ him in place of the underperforming Luca Filippi. Finishing 4th in the sprint race at Hungaroring, he scored his first ever points in any racing class outside Japan.

Yamamoto kept his seat at ART for the 2008–09 GP2 Asia Series where he was looking to emulate the success of Grosjean, who won the inaugural championship with the team. However, he was somewhat overshadowed by team-mates Nico Hülkenberg and Pastor Maldonado, but managed to finish 9th in the championship, with a podium at the opening race in Shanghai.

HRT (2010)

On 17 April 2010 the Hispania Racing team announced that Yamamoto would become the test and reserve driver for the team, and that he would drive the car in  free practice sessions over the course of the 2010 season, helping Hispania develop their car. He took part in his first practice session for the team at the  where he set the slowest lap time of the session. His rear wing struck the mechanic resulting in him being taken to hospital where he stayed for 10 days before being discharged and returning home to Germany. He returned at the following race in Japan, finishing in 16th place, albeit last of the 16 cars to make the flag. He bettered this result by coming 15th in Korea, but was again replaced by Klien for the final two races in Brazil and Abu Dhabi.

Virgin (2011)
On 23 March 2011, Marussia Virgin Racing announced that Yamamoto would be the team's reserve driver for the first three races of the  season.

Later career

Formula E
Yamamoto was called in to replace António Félix da Costa for the 2015 London ePrix. He raced for Amlin Aguri, partnering Salvador Duran. Round 10 saw Yamamoto qualify his car in 18th position but he retired from the race after a problem with the battery coming out of the pits. The next race saw him suffer a similar fate. He failed to set a time in qualifying after the tricky rain conditions caused him to hit the wall and then also retired from the race after running into the back of Jarno Trulli. He finished the season with no points and 35th and last in the standings.

Super Formula Lights
Yamamoto entered the last round of the 2020 Super Formula Lights at Fuji for B-Max, scoring a best finish of 7th in the third race.

After racing
Yamamoto has not raced regularly since his Formula E outings, and has concentrated on a career in medicine and social welfare. In 2012 he became the head of a medical and social welfare corporation in Japan, with particular emphasis on improving the social welfare of the elderly. He also lectures and provides support to schools in the same field. He also still works in racing, in broadcasting and the media.

On 31 October 2021 he was elected to the Japanese House of Representatives.

Racing record

Career summary

‡ Team standings.

Complete Formula Three Euro Series results
(key) (Races in bold indicate pole position) (Races in italics indicate fastest lap)

† Driver did not finish the race, but was classified as he completed over 90% of the race distance.

Complete Formula Nippon results
(key)

‡ Race stopped earlier due to heavy rain. Only half-points were awarded.

Complete Super GT results
(key) (Races in bold indicate pole position) (Races in italics indicate fastest lap)

Complete Formula One results
(key)

Complete GP2 Series results
(key) (Races in bold indicate pole position) (Races in italics indicate fastest lap)

Complete GP2 Asia Series results
(key) (Races in bold indicate pole position) (Races in italics indicate fastest lap)

Complete Formula E results
(key) (Races in bold indicate pole position; races in italics indicate fastest lap)

References

External links

 Sakon Yamamoto Official Website (Japanese)
 Sakon Yamamoto Racing Profile at the Formula Nippon Official Website
 Sakon Yamamoto profile and 2006 statistics

1982 births
Living people
People from Toyohashi
Members of the House of Representatives (Japan)
Liberal Democratic Party (Japan) politicians
Japanese sportsperson-politicians
Japanese racing drivers
Japanese Formula One drivers
Super Aguri Formula One drivers
Spyker Formula One drivers
HRT Formula One drivers
Formula Nippon drivers
GP2 Series drivers
Japanese Formula 3 Championship drivers
British Formula Three Championship drivers
German Formula Three Championship drivers
Formula 3 Euro Series drivers
Super GT drivers
GP2 Asia Series drivers
ADAC GT Masters drivers
Formula E drivers
ART Grand Prix drivers
Team Aguri drivers
TOM'S drivers
Nismo drivers
Kondō Racing drivers
Team Rosberg drivers
Kolles Racing drivers
Rebellion Racing drivers
Target Racing drivers
B-Max Racing drivers